The term electric bath applies to numerous devices. These include: an early form of tanning bed, which was featured on the RMS Olympic, RMS Titanic, SS Adriatic and in numerous light care institutes; a cabinet in which ultraviolet light is applied to the user via lamps. These were often upstanding versions of the common electric bath which continue to exist today; an electrically heated steam bath. Often, these devices were also known as the "portable Turkish bath".

Tanning bed
The electric bath as an early tanning bed was an old sunbed device designed and produced by the German firm of Heraeus, which produced numerous ultraviolet lamps during the early 1900s, as well as a particular self-standing horizontal reclining tanning device known as the electric bath.

The electric bath consisted of a wooden stand which contained an electrical power supply. Above the wooden stand was a green sheet-metal cabinet lid which contained many ultraviolet lamps, and four additional lamps which could be set into the lid and hooked in with metallic clamps. The additional lamps were placed on either side of the bath lid, as well as at the end to provide the user with extra tanning around the arm and feet areas.

Users would open the lid, recline on a metallic surface placed upon the wooden stand, and close the lid. Often, a bath attendant would set the timer on the bath to a specific time, and the lamps would light up, sending waves of ultraviolet rays at the user's skin, creating a tan.

The early models of the Heraeus electric bath are now considered dangerous, but conditions such as skin cancer were never known to be caused by the ultraviolet rays conducted by the lamps during the time period they were featured and used in the device. Care had to be taken that the device was used in moderation. Many users survived and enjoyed the experience, although many mention having been burnt, most probably caused by exceeding the recommended 30-minute time limit.

The electric bath was featured on the RMS Titanic inside the Turkish baths. Women could use the bath during the morning hours, and men could use it during the afternoon and evening hours. A ticket was required to use the bath, and could be purchased from the bath attendants for four shillings or one dollar.

The bath was also featured in the game Titanic: Adventure Out of Time by Cyberflix. In the game, the bath was depicted as a Turkish steam bath for therapeutic and recreational use rather than as a tanning bed. The bath is sabotaged by another character and electrocutes the user inside.

References

Bathing